Chaffey Dam is a minor ungated rock fill with clay core embankment dam with an uncontrolled morning glory spillway across the Peel River, located upstream of the city of Tamworth, in the New England region of New South Wales, Australia. The dam's purpose includes flood mitigation, irrigation, water supply, and water conservation.

Location and features
Water from the dam is released directly into the Peel River which is used by irrigators downstream of the dam, and for water supply of the city of Tamworth.

The dam uses an unusual concrete morning glory bell-shaped uncontrolled spillway which is capable of discharging .

Chaffey Dam provides valuable public recreation including swimming, sailing, boating and fishing.

Upgrade of facilities
An 13 million upgrade of Chaffey Dam commenced during 2010 that involved the construction of a  auxiliary spillway with release plug, funded by the Government of New South Wales and was completed in early 2011. A second stage A$43.33 million augmentation commenced in 2013, funded by the Australian Government, the NSW Government and Tamworth Regional Council. The project also involves a realignment of roads on the western foreshore; the Tamworth-Nundle Road, and River Road.

Etymology
The dam is named in honor of Frank Chaffey, who represented Tamworth in the New South Wales Legislative Assembly between 1913 and 1940,  and his son, [[Bill Nye
|Bill]], who represented the same seat between 1940 and 1973.

Gallery

See also

 List of dams and reservoirs in New South Wales

References

External links

 
 

Dams in New South Wales
Dams completed in 1979
New England (New South Wales)
Northern Tablelands
Embankment dams